Ramón Balcells may refer to:
Ramón Balcells Comas (born 1951), Spanish Olympic sailor
Ramón Balcells Rodón (1919–1999), Spanish Olympic sailor